The double disc is a Pictish symbol of unknown meaning that is frequently found on Class I and Class II Pictish stones, as well as on Pictish metalwork. The symbol can be found with and without an overlaid Z-rod (also of unknown meaning), and in combinations of both (as with the Monifieth 1 stone).

Gallery

References

Symbols on Pictish stones